The Department of Employment, Education and Training (DEET) was an Australian government department that existed between July 1987 and March 1996.

Scope
Information about the department's functions and/or government funding allocation could be found in the Administrative Arrangements Orders, the annual Portfolio Budget Statements and in the Department's annual reports.

At its creation, the Department was responsible for the following:
Education, other than migrant adult education
Youth Affairs
Employment and training
Commonwealth Employment Service
Labour market programs
Co-ordination of research policy
Research grants and fellowships

Structure
The Department was an Australian Public Service department, staffed by officials who were responsible to the Minister for Employment, Education and Training.

References

Ministries established in 1987
Employment, Education and Training